The Museum Kedaton Sultan Ternate (Palace of the Sultan of Ternate Museum) is a museum of relics from the era of the Sultanate of Ternate. The museum is located in the Village of Soa-sio, North Ternate, Ternate, North Maluku, Indonesia.

History

Museum Kedaton Sultan of Ternate is a 1500 square meter building situated on 1.5 acres of land, commissioned on 24 November 1813 by Sultan Muhammad Ali. It was built by a Chinese architect as a palace for the Sultan. The palace was handed over to the Indonesian Ministry of Education and Culture in 1981 and was inaugurated as a museum in 1982, though it still functions as a residence for the Sultan.

References 

Museums in Indonesia
Ternate
Buildings and structures in North Maluku
Tourist attractions in North Maluku